Griffin Creek is a stream in the U.S. state of Oregon.  It is a tributary to Bear Creek.

Griffin Creek was named in 1852 after Captain B.B. Griffin.

References

Rivers of Oregon
Rivers of Jackson County, Oregon